This is a complete list of fellows of the Royal Society elected in 1914. There were no foreign members elected this year.

Royal Fellow 

Arthur Frederick Patrick Albert, Prince of Great Britain and Ireland

Fellows 

Edgar Johnson Allen
Richard Assheton
Geoffrey Thomas Bennett
Sir Rowland Harry Biffen
Arthur Edwin Boycott
Clive Cuthbertson
Sir Henry Hallett Dale
Sir Arthur Stanley Eddington
Edmund Johnston Garwood
Sir Thomas Henry Havelock
Thomas Martin Lowry
Diarmid Noel Paton
Siegfried Ruhemann
Samuel Walter Johnson Smith
Sir Thomas Edward Stanton

Statute 12 

Victor Christian William Cavendish, 9th Duke of Devonshire
Edward Grey, Viscount Grey of Fallodon

1914
1914 in the United Kingdom
1914 in science